The Tolson River is a river in Stewart Island, New Zealand. A tributary of Freshwater River, it rises north of Mount Rakeahua and flows into that river near its outlet into Paterson Inlet.

See also
List of rivers of New Zealand

References

Rivers of Stewart Island